Simon Boch (born 18 April 1994) is a German long-distance runner. In 2020, he competed in the men's race at the 2020 World Athletics Half Marathon Championships held in Gdynia, Poland. He finished in 35th place.

In 2019, he competed in the men's event at the 2019 European 10,000m Cup held in London, United Kingdom.

Achievements

References

External links 
 

Living people
1994 births
Place of birth missing (living people)
German male long-distance runners
German male cross country runners
German male mountain runners
German national athletics champions
21st-century German people